East Grand Forks (also known as EGF) is a city in Polk County, Minnesota, United States. The population was 9,176 at the 2020 Census, making it the largest community in Polk County.

It is located in the Red River Valley region along the eastern bank of the Red River of the North, directly across from the larger city of Grand Forks, North Dakota. The cities of Grand Forks and East Grand Forks form the center of the Grand Forks, ND–MN Metropolitan Statistical Area, which is often called Greater Grand Forks. The population was 104,362 at the 2020 Census.

History
A post office called East Grand Forks has been in operation since 1883. The city was named for its location east of Grand Forks, North Dakota. East Grand Forks was incorporated in 1887.

Flood of 1997

East Grand Forks, along with Grand Forks, was heavily damaged by a major flood in 1997. The entire city was under a mandatory evacuation and almost no homes were spared damage.  After the flood, several neighborhoods had to be demolished because of damage. The city cleared development from the floodplain bordering the Red and Red Lake rivers. It developed a large park known as the Greater Grand Forks Greenway to provide a new recreation area for residents along the river. A similar park was developed in Grand Forks, North Dakota on the opposite side of the river. The parklands, with trees and a variety of greenery, can absorb floodwaters and help protect the cities naturally.  Moving residential and business development out of these areas also helps prevent future flood damage. In addition, a new system of dikes was constructed to protect the city from future flooding.

The city has rebuilt. New businesses attracted to the downtown include a Cabela's sporting goods store and Moore Theaters.

Geography
East Grand Forks is located in the flat, fertile Red River Valley, formed by the ancient glacial Lake Agassiz.

East Grand Forks developed on both sides of the Red Lake River, which joins with the Red River in town. The main part of town is located north of the river; this was the original section which developed as the downtown area, as well as several early residential neighborhoods. The area south of the river is known as "The Point." The land narrows almost to a peninsula at the confluence of the Red and Red Lake rivers. "The Point" contains more residential development.

Demographics

2020 census
As of the census of 2020, there were 9,176 people, 3,831 households, and 3,558 families residing in the city. There were 3,831 housing units. The racial makeup of the city was 80.2% White, 7.3% African American, 2.8% Native American, 0.4% Asian, 3.0% from other races, and 
3.0% from two or more races. Hispanic or Latino of any race were 6.1% of the population.

There were 3,831 households, of which 27.2% had children under the age of 18 living with them, 49.2% were married couples living together, 30.9% had a female householder with no husband present, 18.7% had a male householder with no wife present, and 44.0% were non-families. 28.7% of all households were made up of individuals, and 14.5% had someone living alone who was 65 years of age or older. The average household size was 3.26 and the average family size was 3.09.

The median age in the city was 34.5 years. 9.3% of residents were under the age of 5; 27.2% of residents were under the age of 18; 72.8% were 18 years of age or older and 14.5% were 65 years of age or older The gender makeup of the city was 50.4% male and 49.6% female.

2010 census
As of the census of 2010, there were 8,601 people, 3,488 households, and 2,258 families residing in the city. The racial makeup of the city was 91.1% White, 1.3% African American, 1.8% Native American, 0.6% Asian, 2.4% from other races, and 2.9% from two or more races. Hispanic or Latino of any race were 6.5% of the population.

There were 3,488 households, of which 33.8% had children under the age of 18 living with them, 49.3% were married couples living together, 11.8% had a female householder with no husband present, 3.7% had a male householder with no wife present, and 35.3% were non-families. 28.7% of all households were made up of individuals, and 12% had someone living alone who was 65 years of age or older. The average household size was 2.45 and the average family size was 3.03.

The median age in the city was 35 years. 25.8% of residents were under the age of 18; 10.5% were between the ages of 18 and 24; 25.8% were from 25 to 44; 24.8% were from 45 to 64; and 13.3% were 65 years of age or older. The gender makeup of the city was 49.2% male and 50.8% female.

2000 census
As of the census of 2000, there were 7,501 people, 2,929 households, and 1,933 families residing in the city. The racial makeup of the city was 90.97% White, 0.52% African American, 1.68% Native American, 0.33% Asian, 0.01% Pacific Islander, 4.47% from other races, and 2.01% from two or more races. Hispanic or Latino of any race were 7.53% of the population.

There were 2,929 households, out of which 36.8% had children under the age of 18 living with them, 51.3% were married couples living together, 11.2% had a female householder with no husband present, and 34.0% were non-families. 28.1% of all households were made up of individuals, and 10.8% had someone living alone who was 65 years of age or older.  The average household size was 2.54 and the average family size was 3.16.

In the city, the population was spread out, with 28.8% under the age of 18, 10.8% from 18 to 24, 27.8% from 25 to 44, 20.9% from 45 to 64, and 11.7% who were 65 years of age or older.  The median age was 34 years. For every 100 females, there were 98.0 males.  For every 100 females age 18 and over, there were 94.6 males.

The median income for a household in the city was $35,866, and the median income for a family was $47,846. Males had a median income of $33,134 versus $22,094 for females. The per capita income for the city was $16,599.  About 8.2% of families and 12.4% of the population were below the poverty line, including 15.7% of those under age 18 and 8.6% of those age 65 or over.

Education

K–12
The East Grand Forks School District enrolls 1,758 students and operates two elementary schools (South Point Elementary and New Heights Elementary), Central Middle School, and East Grand Forks Senior High School. There are also two private Christian schools. Sacred Heart School is a Roman Catholic school has students attending from across the region, from both North Dakota and Minnesota. Riverside Christian School is a nondenominational Christian elementary, middle and high school.

Higher education
The only higher educational institution in East Grand Forks is Northland Community & Technical College or Northland for short, which also has a campus 50 miles northeast in Thief River Falls. The history of Northland Community & Technical College's East Grand Forks campus dates back to December 1971, when the local school district was designated for an Area Vocational Technical Institute (AVTI). The first classes of the East Grand Forks AVTI were offered in January 1973 in rented facilities. The present facility opened in April 1975. Northland - EGF grew with expansion and partnerships.

The name of the college changed several times throughout its history. One of its most prominent consolidations was as Northwest Technical College from 1992-2003.

In July 2003, the East Grand Forks campus of Northwest Technical College merged with Northland Community & Technical College of Thief River Falls to become a fully comprehensive college The 2-year school has seen steady growth in enrollment in the past 5 years. Across the Red River in Grand Forks is the University of North Dakota.

Infrastructure
East Grand Forks is served by 3 bus routes of Cities Area Transit which connect the city to Grand Forks.

Four-lane U.S. Route 2; U.S. 2 Business Route; and Minnesota Highway 220 are three of the main roadways in the city. Other nearby routes in the Grand Forks-East Grand Forks area include Interstate Highway 29, to the west of Grand Forks' downtown, and U.S. Highway 81.

Commerce and recreation
East Grand Forks has a downtown shopping district that includes a small shopping center, a 12-screen movie theater, a Cabela's sporting goods store, and several local restaurants.

After the Flood of 1997, the Federal Emergency Management Agency (FEMA) recommended against replacing residential or business development in the floodplain. The land on both sides of the river was developed as a park and state recreation area, known as the Red River State Recreation Area. This is a part of the Greater Grand Forks Greenway. It provides a place for residents to enjoy recreation near the river, as well as protecting the cities. The trees and greenery in this zone can help absorb future seasonal flooding. In the northern part of town is a public golf course, Valley Golf Course.

Local events
East Grand Forks has several annual local community events, such as the Catfish Days and the Frosty Bobber fishing tournaments, Heritage Days, and arts and crafts shows. EGF shares certain events with Grand Forks, such as the Potato Bowl parade and First Night, a New Year's celebration that's alcohol free. Catfish Days, based on an annual summer catfishing tournament, attracts people from all over the United States and Canada. It is one of the largest fishing tournaments in the region.

Each June, the Grand Cities Art Fest takes place in the downtowns of Grand Forks and East Grand Forks. The city holds an Art & Wine Walk one Saturday each month during the summer. A farmer's market is another popular event. Local produce and craft items are for sale in the Town Square on Saturdays, starting in late June and running until late September.

Media

East Grand Forks has a local weekly newspaper, The Exponent. Otherwise, the town is served by the media of Grand Forks and KROX of Crookston, Minnesota. Radio stations KZLT and KGFK broadcasting from Grand Forks, North Dakota are licensed to East Grand Forks.

Notable people
 Carl Panzram, Serial killer
 Kurt Knoff, NFL safety. Played for Minnesota Vikings, Houston Oilers and Denver Broncos
 Pat Owens, Mayor of Grand Forks during the 1997 Red River Flood in the United States.
Molly Yeh, Author and blogger

References

External links
 City of East Grand Forks
 Grand Forks Herald, regional daily newspaper printed in Grand Forks, ND

Cities in Minnesota
Cities in Polk County, Minnesota
Greater Grand Forks